Bay City Park, is a multi-purpose stadium in the suburb of Oteha in Auckland, New Zealand.  It is used for football matches and cricket and is the home stadium of NRFL Championship side East Coast Bays.

History
In 1991, Bay City Park was opened as the new home of East Coast Bays.

In September 2022, FIFA announced that Bay City Park were shortlisted to be a team base camp for the 2023 FIFA Women's World Cup. On 12 December 2022, it was announced Bay City Park would be used as the training ground for the United States during the world cup. As part of being a host venue, Bay City Park will receive upgrades to the lower fields in order to be up to international standard. The changing rooms are also being upgraded including expanding two of them and having heating installed in the club rooms.

International matches
Bay City Park has hosted one international match between New Zealand U-20s and Austria U-20s. This was a friendly game in the build up to the 2015 FIFA U-20 World Cup held in New Zealand.

References

1991 establishments in New Zealand
Association football venues in New Zealand
Sports venues in Auckland
Sports venues completed in 1991
Association football in Auckland